The Celtics–Lakers rivalry is a National Basketball Association (NBA) rivalry between the Boston Celtics and the Los Angeles Lakers. The Celtics and the Lakers are the two most storied franchises in the NBA, and the rivalry has been called the greatest in the NBA. They would both go on to dominate the league in the 1960s and 1980s, facing each other in the Finals six times in the 1960s, three times in the 1980s, and twice since the year 2000.

The Lakers and Celtics are tied for the highest number of championships in the NBA at 17 apiece, (12 as the L.A. Lakers and 5 as the Minneapolis Lakers). Together, they account for 34 of the 74 championships (or 45%) in NBA history. As of 2018, the Celtics and Lakers have a .590 and .596 all-time winning records respectively. As of the end of the 2020–21 season, Boston is the only team with a winning overall record against the Lakers.

The rivalry has been less intense since the retirements of Larry Bird and Magic Johnson in the early 1990s. In 2008 the two teams met in the NBA Finals for the first time since 1987, with the Celtics winning the series 4–2. They met again in the 2010 NBA Finals, which the Lakers won in 7 games.

History

1950s: Minneapolis Lakers dynasty and Boston Celtics
During the first decade of the NBA in the 1950s, the Minneapolis Lakers had the first NBA dynasty. Minneapolis would win the first ever Championship Series of the newly formed NBA in 1950 (three BAA Finals were played between 1947–1949 and retroactively counted as NBA Championships, one of which was won by the Lakers in 1949).  Under Hall of Fame head coach John Kundla, and with the NBA's first superstar in George Mikan,  they would win three more titles in 1952, 1953, and 1954.  The Celtics would emerge behind early NBA star Bob Cousy by winning the 1957 NBA Finals and losing in 1958.

The first NBA Finals match-up between the two teams was in 1959 when on April 9, the Boston Celtics swept the Minneapolis Lakers 4-0 for the first sweep in the history of the NBA Finals.  This would mark the first Finals loss for the previously dominant Lakers, and the first of eight straight titles for Boston.

1960s: Boston Celtics dynasty and Los Angeles Lakers
The Lakers relocated to Los Angeles in 1960. It was after this move, and during this decade, that the rivalry would truly escalate. The two teams emerged as the strongest in the NBA, featuring greats such as Bill Russell, Tom Heinsohn, John Havlicek, Sam Jones and head coach Red Auerbach for Boston and Elgin Baylor, Jerry West, Gail Goodrich, and coach/GM Fred Schaus for Los Angeles. However, it would ultimately prove to be the decade of the Celtics, who won the finals every year in the 1960s except for 1967.  The Lakers would be the Celtics opponent in six of those series: 1962, 1963, 1965, 1966, 1968, and 1969.  The Celtics won all of those match-ups. Three of those series (1962, 1966, and 1969) went seven games.  The Celtics win over the Lakers in 1966 marked an unprecedented eight consecutive championships, the longest streak of any North American professional sports team.

The Lakers acquired Wilt Chamberlain in 1968, which brought the personal rivalry between him and Bill Russell, previously a feature of the Celtics-76ers rivalry, to Celtics-Lakers. The Lakers posted the best record in the West during the 1968–1969 season. By contrast, the aging Celtics struggled to obtain the fourth seed, with Russell and Jones playing in their final seasons. Despite this, the Celtics upset the Philadelphia 76ers and the New York Knicks and made it to the Finals. The Lakers had home court advantage for the first time and won the first two games, but the Celtics rebounded to force and win a dramatic Game 7 at the Los Angeles Forum, defying Laker's owner Jack Kent Cooke's infamous prediction of a Lakers celebration. West was named Finals MVP despite being on the losing team, but it was small consolation in a decade where the Lakers went without a championship, every one of their Finals' losses in that decade coming at the hands of the Celtics.

The 1969 Finals also caused a deterioration in the relationship between Russell and Chamberlain, who had previously been friends despite their rivalry, into one of intense loathing, when Chamberlain took himself out of the decisive Game 7 with six minutes left, and Russell thereafter accused Chamberlain of being a malingerer and of "copping out" of the game when it seemed that the Lakers would lose. Chamberlain (whose knee was so bad that he could not play the entire offseason and ruptured it in the next season) was livid at Russell and saw him as a backstabber. The two men did not talk to each other for over 20 years until Russell attempted to patch things up, although he never uttered a genuine apology. When Chamberlain died in 1999, Chamberlain's nephew stated that Russell was the second person he was ordered to break the news to.

1970s: Championships but no rematch
The Celtics and Lakers both found success in the 1970s, but there would be no rematch between the two teams.

The start of the decade saw the Lakers' woes in the NBA Finals continue, with a loss to the New York Knicks in 1970. However, the Lakers rebounded two years later to win the 1972 NBA Finals and their first championship in Los Angeles, also against the Knicks.  This would also prove to be Laker great Jerry West's only NBA title. The following year, the Lakers again faced the Knicks in the 1973 NBA Finals and lost. They would not make it to the Finals again in this decade, but in 1975 they acquired Kareem Abdul-Jabbar.

The Celtics won the NBA Finals in 1974, and won again in 1976, under the leadership of coach Tom Heinsohn and players Dave Cowens, Paul Silas and Jo Jo White.

Neither team won another championship until the 1980s. However, the foundation for the renewed Celtics–Lakers rivalry of the 1980s was actually laid down in college basketball of the late 1970s. During the 1978–79 NCAA season, Michigan State was led by Magic Johnson to the championship game of the NCAA Tournament, where they faced Indiana State University, which was led by senior Larry Bird. In what was the most-watched college basketball game ever, Michigan State defeated Indiana State 75–64, and Johnson was voted Most Outstanding Player of the Final Four. Johnson would go on to be drafted by the Lakers, and Bird by the Celtics. The personal rivalry formed by these two basketball greats during college would transfer to their NBA careers, and reignite the rivalry between the two storied franchises that they came to represent.

1980s: Showtime Lakers and Larry Bird
The Celtics–Lakers rivalry was renewed in the 1980s, in large part due to the personal rivalry between Bird and Johnson. Magic said of the games against the Celtics, "when the new schedule would come out each year, I'd grab it and circle the Boston games. To me, it was The Two and the other 80."  Similarly, Bird said that, "the first thing I would do every morning was look at the box scores to see what Magic did. I didn't care about anything else."

The Showtime Lakers struck the first blow, winning the 1980 NBA Finals against the Philadelphia 76ers. The following year, behind the "Big Three" of future Hall of Famers Bird, Kevin McHale, and Robert Parish, the Celtics won the 1981 NBA Finals against the Houston Rockets.

The Celtics lost the 1982 Eastern Conference Finals to the 76ers, and along with it the possibility of a rematch with the Lakers. However, the final game of that series is memorable to the rivalry because Boston fans chanted for the 76ers, who were just about to eliminate their Celtics, to "Beat L.A.!" Despite the encouragement, the 76ers lost the 1982 NBA Finals to the Lakers, who were led by new head coach Pat Riley.  However, the 76ers defeated the Lakers the following year in the 1983 NBA Finals. The 1982–1983 season would also be the rookie year of Laker James Worthy, another Hall of Famer in the storied rivalry.

The Celtics would get a new head coach in K.C. Jones, who was also a former Celtics player, and two teams finally had their long-awaited rematch in the 1984 NBA Finals, a grueling seven game series that had many memorable moments, including a 137–104 blowout in Game 3 that led Bird to call his Celtic teammates "sissies", the Kevin McHale takedown of Laker forward Kurt Rambis which led to increased physical aggression by both teams, the sweltering heat of the infamously un-airconditioned Boston Garden in Game 5, and Cedric Maxwell's 24-point performance in Game 7. The Celtics went on to win in seven games, increasing their record of Finals' series victories against the Lakers to 8–0.

The following year, the Lakers finally had their revenge, winning the 1985 NBA Finals by taking Game 6 in Boston Garden, becoming the only visiting team to win an NBA championship in that arena. Lakers owner Jerry Buss famously remarked that "this has removed the most odious sentence in the English language. It can never again be said that 'the Lakers have never beaten the Celtics'".

The Celtics rebounded the following year to win the 1986 NBA Finals against the Rockets. In the 1987 NBA Finals, the two teams met for a tie-breaker of their 1980s Finals matches, and the Lakers once again emerged victorious in six games, with the iconic image of Johnson's junior sky hook. This series marked the end of an era for the Celtics. They did not reach the Finals again until 2008. The Lakers, meanwhile, went on to win the 1988 NBA Finals against the Detroit Pistons, before losing to the Pistons the following year in 1989, and win titles again in 2000, 2001 and 2002, all while the Celtics wallowed in mediocrity.

Several journalists hypothesized that the Johnson–Bird rivalry was so appealing because it represented many other contrasts, such as the clash between the Lakers and Celtics, between Hollywood flashiness ("Lakers Showtime") and Boston/Indiana blue collar grit ("Celtic Pride"), and between blacks and whites. Race was a determining factor for fans in the 80’s, with a surge of white fans cheering for the predominately white Celtics team and black fans appreciating the more athletic style of the Lakers.  The city of Boston itself was split, as in an anecdote said by Magic Johnson, he mentioned a black fan that came up to him to tell him that the majority of black Boston cheered for the Lakers over the home team Celtics. Deemed the “Great White Hope '', Larry Bird was seen by Boston as a means to represent their views, “to be their final stronghold to a game that in less than 20 years had turned almost completely black demographically”.But, Bird never bought into the narrative, rejecting the label “Great White Hope '' and focusing purely on wanting to, as teammate Maxwell would say, “kick some ass and win”. Magic and Bird held the highest respect for each other, demonstrating on a national platform, “how people of different races and backgrounds can compete, be rivals even, and still coexist”.A 1984 Converse commercial for its "Weapon" line of basketball shoes (endorsed by both Bird and Johnson) reflected the perceived dichotomy between the two players. In the commercial, Bird is practicing alone on a rural basketball court when Johnson pulls up in a sleek limousine and challenges him to a one-on-one match. Despite their on the court rivalry, the two became friends after filming the commercial together.

Amidst a time where the NBA saw diminishing views, the Celtics-Lakers rivalry, led by Bird and Johnson, helped bring national attention to the NBA. In just their first Finals matchup, game 7 drew in a record breaking 40 million views on CBS.  As a result, CBS started to shift their focus on the Celtics and the Lakers, showcasing a double header with both teams playing every weekend. With the two future Hall of Famers, the league won a whole generation of new fans.  The rivalry between Bird, Johnson, and their teams contributed greatly to the success of the league during the decade; according to Bryant Gumbel, "Magic and Larry saved the NBA."  Sports journalist Larry Schwartz of ESPN asserted that Johnson and Bird saved the NBA from bankruptcy. In every single NBA Finals series during the 1980s, either the Lakers or the Celtics were present.

Many basketball experts also mention how Bird and Magic changed the way the game was played. They gave people different perspectives on the game, like making that extra pass on the fast break or going up hard for a layup. They were basketball geniuses and played a game that required fundamentals and hard work; something that can be replicated by the fans watching their games.  Jerry West, when talking about Bird and Magic, said that, “They definitely had a positive impact on the league”.

Playing off their rivalry in the NCAA and NBA, Johnson and Bird reunited to promote Game 5 of the 2018 World Series between the Los Angeles Dodgers (of which Johnson is a part-owner) and Boston Red Sox. In contrast to the frequent Lakers-Celtics championship match-ups, the Dodgers and Red Sox were meeting in the World Series for the first time (since the Dodgers franchise relocated to Los Angeles).

1990s: Lull and rebuilding
During the 1990s, the rivalry died down. Only the Lakers made an appearance in the NBA Finals that decade, losing the 1991 NBA Finals to Michael Jordan and the Chicago Bulls, the first championship in the Bulls' dynasty. This would prove to be a defining moment of the NBA, a changing of the old guard as the Lakers and Celtics fell into mediocrity, while the Bulls won six titles led by Jordan, Scottie Pippen and coach Phil Jackson, who would cement their respective reputations as the greatest player and coach in NBA history.  Both teams also faced set backs in the form of personal misfortune.  On November 7, 1991, Johnson announced he had tested positive for HIV and would retire immediately.  Celtics star Reggie Lewis died of a heart attack in his prime in 1993, further marring the team in tragedy since second overall pick Len Bias died of a drug overdose two days after he was drafted in 1986. In 1994, neither the Lakers nor the Celtics made the playoffs, marking the first time in the history of the NBA that both teams missed the playoffs in the same season.

However, the Lakers began the rebuilding process in 1996 by trading for Kobe Bryant, who was drafted from high school that year by the Charlotte Hornets. That same year, the Lakers signed Shaquille O'Neal. Meanwhile, in 1998, the Celtics drafted Paul Pierce, a native of Inglewood, California who had grown up as a Lakers fan. The following year, in 1999, Phil Jackson joined the Lakers as head coach.

2000–2007: Lakers championships
The Lakers returned to prominence in the early 2000s. Under Jackson's guidance, and with O'Neal and Bryant leading the way, the Lakers won three straight championships in 2000, 2001, and 2002.  The Lakers' title in 2000 came against the Indiana Pacers who were coached by Celtic legend Bird. Paul Pierce's nickname, "The Truth", was accorded to him by Shaquille O'Neal after a 112-107 Lakers' victory over the Celtics on March 13, 2001 in which Pierce scored 42 points on 13 of 19 shooting.  O'Neal pulled a Boston reporter over and gestured toward his notepad. "Take this down", said O'Neal. "My name is Shaquille O'Neal and Paul Pierce is the [expletive] truth. Quote me on that and don't take nothing out. I knew he could play, but I didn't know he could play like this. Paul Pierce is the truth." In 2002, the Celtics, with Pierce and Antoine Walker, made an impressive run for the Finals and the two teams narrowly missed each other.  However, the Celtics eventually fell in six games to the New Jersey Nets in that year's Eastern Conference Finals.

The Lakers returned to the Finals in 2004 but lost at the hands of the Detroit Pistons. Thereafter, O'Neal was traded to the Miami Heat.  Without O'Neal, the Lakers missed the playoffs the following year and failed to advance to the Finals for the next three years.

The Celtics likewise made little playoff progress after their near Finals run in 2002. In 2004, they hired head coach Doc Rivers. In 2007, they made blockbuster trades for All-Stars Kevin Garnett and Ray Allen, who complemented career-long Celtics star Paul Pierce and emerging star Rajon Rondo.

2008–2010: Rivalry renewed
With the addition of Allen and Garnett alongside Pierce to become the new "Big Three", along with the emergence of Rajon Rondo, the Celtics returned to the top of the NBA in the 2007–2008 season by posting the best record in the league and reaching the Finals. The Lakers also returned to the Finals with the help of the mid-season acquisition of Pau Gasol, and the two teams finally met again in the 2008 NBA Finals. The Celtics won in six games with an impressive come-from-behind victory in Game 4 and a blow-out of the Lakers in Game 6. The next season, the Lakers and Celtics played a regular season game on Christmas Day. The Lakers won that game, making Phil Jackson the fastest coach to win 1,000 games. They went on to win the 2009 NBA Finals that season, but the Celtics were eliminated by eventual Eastern Conference champions Orlando Magic.  In 2009, the Lakers signed Ron Artest (now Metta World Peace).

The summer before the 2009–2010 season, Phil Jackson ran into Paul Pierce and told him, "Get it back, we want to meet you in the Finals."  The Lakers ended the season with the West's best record, while the Celtics would enter the playoffs as the number four seed. Build up for a rematch began with the Lakers taking a 2–0 lead over the Phoenix Suns in the Western Conference Finals, with chants of "We Want Boston!" erupting in the Staples Center. Likewise, chants of "Beat L.A.!" erupted up in TD Garden as the Celtics took a commanding 3–0 lead over the Magic in the  Eastern Conference Finals. Both teams fended off late series surges from their opponents, but won their respective series 4–2, setting up a rematch in the 2010 NBA Finals.

The 2010 series had many memorable moments, including impressive performances from Bryant who led in points for six of the seven games, Ray Allen's Finals' record eight 3-pointers in Game 2, Derek Fisher carrying his team to victory and then crying in Game 3, a hard-fought Game 4 where Glen Davis screamed so loud he drooled while Nate Robinson rode on his back, a dominant Lakers performance in Game 6, and a close Game 7 that became the highest rated NBA game since Michael Jordan's second retirement in Game 6 of the 1998 NBA Finals. The Lakers won Game 7 against the Celtics for their very first time, bringing their total number of NBA championships to sixteen (they have one NBL championship in 1948), just one fewer than the Celtics' seventeen.

The Celtics signed Shaquille O'Neal for the 2010–2011 season to replace the injured Kendrick Perkins, adding to the rivalry by bringing the Shaq-Kobe feud to the Celtics-Lakers.  During a game against the Lakers on February 11, 2011, Ray Allen became the all-time NBA leader in total 3-point field goals made. However, both the Lakers and Celtics would be eliminated in the second round of the playoffs that year by the 2011 NBA Finals participants, the Dallas Mavericks and Miami Heat, respectively. The following year they would again both be eliminated by the eventual 2012 NBA Finals participants, the Oklahoma City Thunder and Miami Heat, respectively.  With the disbanding of Boston's Big Three, and anticipated changes to the Lakers' roster, some believe that the 2011–12 NBA season was the last chapter of the current Celtics–Lakers rivalry.

On February 20, 2013, the Lakers played their first game since the death of long time owner Jerry Buss who had died two days earlier, paying tribute to him at the Staples Center before facing off against the Celtics.  The Lakers won 113-99 in a game that saw Steve Nash pass former Lakers star Johnson for fourth on the all-time NBA assist list.

2010s: Roles reversed 
Both the Celtics and Lakers missed the playoffs in the 2013–14 season, marking only the second time it has happened in the rivalry's history.  With the New York Knicks also failing to make the playoffs that season, it marked the first time in NBA history that neither the Celtics, Lakers nor the Knicks qualified for the playoffs in the same season.

But while the Celtics were able to return to the playoffs over the next three seasons and even made the Eastern Conference Finals in 2017 and 2018, the Lakers found themselves in a lengthy rebuilding process. Prior to 2014, the Lakers only missed the playoffs four times since moving to Los Angeles, and five times in franchise history.  However, the Lakers proceeded to miss the playoffs a record six consecutive seasons, highlighted by four straight seasons with over 50 losses and a franchise-low 17–65 mark during the 2015–16 season.

On December 30, 2015, the Boston Celtics honored the Los Angeles Lakers' star Kobe Bryant in his final game in TD Garden. The Lakers would beat the Celtics 112-104.

Nevertheless, the rivalry between the Celtics and the Lakers remained fairly even during this recent period, with the two teams managing a split in the season series four of the last six times. However, battles between the Celtics and the Lakers took a back seat to the emerging rivalry between the Cleveland Cavaliers and the Golden State Warriors, who met in four consecutive NBA Finals between 2015 and 2018, where the Cavaliers were led by a big three of LeBron James, Kyrie Irving, and Kevin Love, while the Warriors were led by a big four of Stephen Curry, Kevin Durant, Klay Thompson, and Draymond Green.

Notwithstanding the Celtics' success and the Lakers' struggles during this period, both teams would make their presence felt in subsequent offseasons. The Lakers' run of futility rewarded them with several high first-round picks (D'Angelo Russell, Brandon Ingram and Lonzo Ball were selected second overall), while the Celtics benefited from the Brooklyn Nets' ill-fated 2013 trade for Paul Pierce and Kevin Garnett with their top-three selections of Jaylen Brown and Jayson Tatum. In addition, the Celtics went on to sign All-Star free agents Al Horford and Gordon Hayward in addition to acquiring Kyrie Irving from the Cavaliers. The Lakers would counter by signing LeBron James in the 2018 offseason. The two teams continued to retool in the 2019 offseason; the Lakers acquired Anthony Davis from the New Orleans Pelicans while the Celtics brought in Kemba Walker after Irving left to join the Nets.

2020: Lakers tie championship record
In the 2020 playoffs, the Celtics reached the Eastern Conference Finals against the Miami Heat, losing in 6 games with Miami denying a Lakers-Celtics matchup, which would've been their first match since the 2010 NBA Finals, while the Lakers defeated the Heat in the 2020 NBA Finals to become NBA champions. Rondo, who was a part of the 2020 Lakers championship team, became the second player in NBA history, after Clyde Lovellette, to win titles with the Celtics and Lakers.

Two seasons later, the Lakers were eliminated from playoff contention for the seventh time in nine seasons, while the Celtics advanced to the NBA Finals for the first time in 12 years after defeating the Brooklyn Nets in the Conference First Round (a rematch from last year's), the defending champion Milwaukee Bucks in the Conference Semifinals (a rematch from 2019), and finally the Miami Heat in the Conference Finals (a rematch from 2020). Attempting to win their 18th title to break a tie with the Lakers for the most titles, the Celtics lost to the Golden State Warriors in six games and, with an eventual Finals record of 17–5, remain tied with the Lakers for the most titles in franchise history.

Finals summaries

1959 NBA Finals

This was the first NBA Finals series between the Lakers and the Celtics, and the only such meeting to occur while the Lakers were still in Minneapolis.  Minneapolis hadn't made an appearance in the Finals since winning four of the first five NBA Championships between 1950–1954, while Boston was making its third straight Finals appearance after winning in 1957 and losing in 1958.
Minneapolis, led by rookie sensation Elgin Baylor, made the Finals by defeating the defending World Champion St. Louis Hawks.  Boston would face a tough seven-game series against the Syracuse Nationals but would eventually emerge victorious, leading Celtic star Bob Cousy to predict that Boston would sweep Minneapolis.  Cousy would prove his prediction correct, leading his team with 51 total assists (still a record for a four-game NBA Finals series) to defeat the Minneapolis Lakers in the first 4–0 sweep ever in the NBA Finals.  This marked the first of Boston's record eight straight titles.

1962 NBA Finals

This was the first NBA Finals series between the Lakers and Celtics after the Lakers moved to Los Angeles.

Boston would win game one.  However, the Lakers would edge out for close victories in Game 2 and Game 3.  The Celtics would win Game 4 before the Lakers would come back and win another close victory in Game 5.  In the Game 5 victory, Baylor grabbed 22 rebounds and set the still-standing NBA record for points in a finals game with 61, despite fouling out of the game. The Celtics won Game 6 to set up the first Game 7 between the two franchises.

In Game 7, Laker Frank Selvy, after making two jumpers in the final 40 seconds to tie the game, missed a potential title-winning 18 foot jump shot in regulation, a miss which he said in June 2010 still haunted him more than 40 years later.  Instead, the game went into overtime and the Celtics won by three points.

1963 NBA Finals

The Lakers and Celtics would meet the following year in 1963.  The Celtics would again defeat the Lakers.

The Celtics took the first two games, but the Lakers would blow the Celtics out with a 20-point differential in Game 3.  Although the Celtics would take Game 4, the Lakers would win Game 5 and fuel speculation that the young Lakers were about to surge past the older Celtics.  A defiant Bill Russell denied that any such thing was going to happen.  Sure enough, despite several close games, including the decisive game only having a three-point differential once again, the Celtics would only require six games to close out the Lakers this time.

This series would also be notable for its future implications in NBA telecasts.  When angry crowds showed up in Los Angeles to buy playoff tickets that were not available, the Lakers quieted the crowd by offering closed circuit TV viewing for $2.50 a head.  "We were aware we were testing the future of pay television", Lakers general manager Lou Mohs told reporters.

1965 NBA Finals

The Celtics would make their ninth straight appearance in the NBA Finals and face the Lakers for the fourth time. Celtics founder Walter A. Brown died during the season, and Red Auerbach led the team back to the Finals with his first Coach of the Year award.  The Celtics defeated the Philadelphia 76ers to enter the Finals, marked by Johnny Most's famous call of "Havlicek stole the ball!"

Unlike their previous two encounters, the Celtics dominated the Lakers, who were playing without an injured Elgin Baylor, and only Game 2 had a close score.  The Celtics would win the series in Game 5 with a 129–96 victory over the Lakers.  This was the largest margin of victory in a deciding Finals game, and would not be broken until 2008, when the Celtics defeated the Lakers once again by a score of 131–92.

1966 NBA Finals

This was the Boston Celtics' eighth consecutive NBA Championship, a feat unrivaled in North American professional sports.  Despite finishing second in the division standings for the first time in a decade, Boston would return to the Finals for a record tenth straight time .

After the Los Angeles Lakers' comeback overtime win in Game 1, Red Auerbach, who had challenged the entire league to topple the Celtics from their reign by announcing he would retire after 1965–1966 before the season had started (thus giving his detractors "one last shot" at him), announced Bill Russell as the Celtics coach for 1966–1967 and beyond, the first African-American coach in the NBA. Laker coach Fred Schaus privately fumed that Red's hiring had taken away all of the accolades his Lakers should have received following their tremendous Game 1 win.

The Celtics won the next three games and looked ready to close out L.A. in Game 5. However, behind the efforts of Elgin Baylor, Jerry West, and Gail Goodrich, the Lakers won the next two games, setting the stage for another classic Game 7 in the Boston Garden. The Celtics raced out to a huge lead, but down by 16 entering the fourth quarter, and 10 with a minute and a half to go, the Lakers mounted a furious rally in the closing moments which fell just short.  The Celtics fended off the late Los Angeles rally to capture the NBA title and send Red Auerbach out a champion.

1968 NBA Finals

After they both missed the NBA Finals in 1967, the Lakers and the Celtics would meet again in 1968.  Boston's streak of 10 consecutive Finals appearances had been snapped in 1967 by the 76ers.  The 1968 Eastern Division Finals rematch between the Celtics and the 76ers, which started on April 21, was marred by the April 4 assassination of Martin Luther King Jr., but the decision was made not to delay the series.

The Lakers, led by new head coach Butch van Breda Kolff, would actually root for the Celtics to win the series, thinking that Bill Russell would be easier to defeat than 76er Wilt Chamberlain (Chamberlain would become a Laker the following season).  The Lakers would get what they wished for and face the Celtics, but ultimately to the same result.  The Celtics won Game 1, and the two teams would alternate victories through Game 5.  Game 5 was notable for an impressive Lakers' comeback sending it into overtime, but the Celtics would ultimately win that game. In Game 6, the Celtics closed out the Lakers in convincing fashion with a 124–109 victory.

1969 NBA Finals

With Bill Russell and Sam Jones in their final season, and plagued with injuries, the Celtics struggled to make the NBA playoffs as the fourth and final seed in the Eastern Conference. They upset the 76ers in the first round and postponed New York's finals appearance for another year. Awaiting the Celtics were the powerful Los Angeles Lakers who had a nucleus of Jerry West, Elgin Baylor and newly acquired Wilt Chamberlain.

After losing the first two games in the Forum in L.A., no one thought Boston would even pull out a victory. However, they won Game 3 and a buzzer-beater by Sam Jones tied the series up at two games apiece. The home team won Games 5 and 6 which set up a dramatic seventh game. Before the game started, Laker's owner Jack Kent Cooke placed flyers in every seat stating "When, not if, the Lakers win the title, balloons will be released from the raftors, the USC marching band will play "Happy Days Are Here Again" and broadcaster Chick Hearn will interview Elgin Baylor, Jerry West and Wilt Chamberlain in that order." Before the game, the Celtics circulated in their locker room a memo about the Lakers' celebration plans. Russell noted the giant net hanging from the ceiling during pregame warmups and said to West, "Those [expletive deleted] balloons are staying up there." West was furious at the balloons for providing the Celtics extra motivation.

Boston played tough through the first half and would keep the game close, with a score of 60–60. Remarkably, Boston would pull away and entered the fourth quarter up by 18. It seemed to be over when Lakers center Wilt Chamberlain was injured and replaced by reserve Mel Counts. The Celtics, however, would begin to show their age when they began missing shots and turning the ball over and Laker Jerry West pulled L.A. to within one. Despite having numerous opportunities, the Lakers couldn't get over the hump and Don Nelson would make an incredible foul-line jump-shot which bounced off the back iron and fell in. During this, another battle was heating up off the court between Jack Kent Cooke and Lakers coach Butch Van Breda Kolff. Chamberlain was pleading for Breda Kolff to put him back in, but he refused. Cooke then came down to personally order the defiant coach to insert Wilt, but to no avail. This would prove critical as the Celtics held on and triumphed 108–106.

The first ever Finals MVP award was given to Jerry West, despite being on the losing team (thus far the only time this has happened).  Despite this, West was inconsolable.  In a show of good sportsmanship, Bill Russell held West's hand and John Havlicek said: "I love you, Jerry!"

1984 NBA Finals

By virtue of a 62–20 record, the Celtics had homecourt advantage over the Lakers who finished the regular season with a 54–28 mark. The Celtics defeated the Lakers four games to three.

The Lakers opened the series with a 115–109 victory at the Boston Garden. In Game 2, the Lakers led 113–111 with 18 seconds left when Gerald Henderson stole a James Worthy pass to score a game tying layup and the Celtics eventually prevailed in overtime 124–121. In Game 3, the Lakers raced to an easy 137–104 victory as Johnson dished out 21 assists. After the game, Bird said his team played like "sissies" in an attempt to light a fire under his teammates. In Game 4, the Lakers had a five-point game lead with less than a minute to play, but made several execution errors as the Celtics tied the game and then came away with a 129–125 victory in overtime. The game was also marked by Celtic forward Kevin McHale's takedown of Laker forward Kurt Rambis on a breakaway layup which triggered the physical aspect of the rivalry.  Kareem Abdul-Jabbar would go after Bird later on in the third quarter, and 1981 Finals MVP Cedric Maxwell further antagonized the Lakers by following a missed James Worthy free throw by crossing the lane with his hands around his own neck, symbolizing that Worthy was "choking" under pressure.  In Game 5, the Celtics took a 3–2 series lead as Bird scored 34 points. The game was known as the "Heat Game", as it was played under 97 °F-heat, and without any air conditioning at the infamous Boston Garden. In Game 6, the Lakers evened the series with a 119–108 victory. In the game, the Lakers answered the Celtics rough tactics when Worthy shoved Cedric Maxwell into a basket support. After the game, a Laker fan threw a beer at Celtics guard M.L. Carr as he left the floor, causing him to label the series "all-out-war." In Game 7, the Celtics were led by Cedric Maxwell, who had 24 points, eight rebounds, and eight assists as they came away with a 111–102 victory. In the game the Lakers rallied from a 14-point deficit to three points down with one minute remaining, when Maxwell knocked the ball away from Magic Johnson. Dennis Johnson responded by sinking two free throws to seal the Celtics' victory. Bird was named MVP of the series.

1985 NBA Finals

The Celtics, looking to repeat as NBA Champions, had homecourt advantage for the second year in a row as they finished the regular season with a 63–19 record while the Lakers compiled a 62–20 record. For the first time, the Finals went to a 2–3–2 format with games one and two in Boston while the next three games were in Los Angeles.

The Los Angeles Lakers defeated the Celtics four games to two. Game 1 became known as the "Memorial Day Massacre" as the Celtics soundly beat the Lakers 148–114.  Celtic reserve forward Scott Wedman made all 11 out of 11 field goal attempts.  The Lakers responded in Game 2 with a 109–102 victory as Kareem Abdul-Jabbar had 30 points, 17 rebounds, eight assists, and three blocks. Michael Cooper had 22 points, making 8 out of 9 field goals attempted.  In Game 3, the Celtics had a 48–38 lead in the second quarter before the Lakers, led by James Worthy, took a 65–59 lead at halftime and then pulled away in the second half to come away with a 136–111 victory.  Worthy had 29 points while Abdul-Jabbar had 26 points and 14 rebounds.  The Celtics tied the series in Game 4, 107–105 as Dennis Johnson hit a jumper at the buzzer. In Game 5, the Lakers raced out to a 64–51 lead and stretched it to 89–72 before the Celtics cut the deficit to 101–97 with six minutes remaining. However, Magic Johnson made three shots while Abdul-Jabbar added four more shots, and the Lakers came away with a 120–111 victory to take a 3–2 series lead.  Abdul-Jabbar led the Lakers with 36 points. The series shifted to Boston with only one full day off for both teams.  In Game 6, the Lakers were led by Abdul-Jabbar who scored 29 points as the Lakers defeated the Celtics 111–100. Magic had a triple-double with 15 points, 14 assists, and 10 rebounds; Worthy had 28 points on 11 for 15 shooting.  It was the first time the road team clinched their NBA championship in Boston, the Golden State Warriors would later do this in 2022. Kareem Abdul-Jabbar was named MVP of the series, making him the oldest player (38 years, 1 month, 24 days) ever to win the MVP of an NBA Finals series.

1987 NBA Finals

After being eliminated in the Western Conference Finals a year earlier, the Lakers returned to the NBA Finals and were awarded homecourt advantage as they accumulated a 65–17 record while the Celtics finished the season with a 59–23 record.

The Los Angeles Lakers defeated the Celtics four games to two. In Game 1, the Los Angeles Lakers came away with a 126–113 victory. Magic Johnson had 29 points, 13 assists, and 8 rebounds, while James Worthy had 33 points, 10 assists, and 9 rebounds.  In Game 2, the Lakers took a 2–0 series lead with a 141–122 victory.   Magic had 22 points and 20 assists, while Michael Cooper made six three-point shots, then a record for most three-pointers made in a single NBA Finals game.  In Game 3, the Celtics posted a 109–103 win, led by Bird, who had 30 points and 12 rebounds. In Game 4, the Celtics had a 16-point lead in the third quarter before the Lakers stormed back into the game. Bird had hit a three-point bomb with 12 seconds remaining to give the Celtics the lead, however, with two seconds remaining, Magic Johnson sank a "junior sky hook" to give the Lakers a 107–106 lead, then Bird missed a 20-foot jumper as time expired, allowing Los Angeles to gain a three games to one lead. In Game 5, the Celtics prevented the Lakers from celebrating in the Boston Garden by coming away with a 123–108 win. Boston guard Danny Ainge made 5 out of 6 three-pointers attempted, including a 45-footer as the first half expired.  In Game 6, the Lakers trailed the Celtics 56–51 at halftime, but thanks to an 18–2 run, they regained control of the game with a 30–12 third quarter to cruise to a 106–93 victory and their fourth championship in the decade. Magic Johnson was named unanimous MVP of the series, averaging 26.2 points, 13.0 assists, 8.0 rebounds, and 2.3 steals, leading the Lakers in all four categories.

2008 NBA Finals

This was the first time the Celtics made the Finals since 1987, while the Lakers' last appearance had been in 2004. Boston was led by their 'Big Three' of Paul Pierce, Kevin Garnett, and Ray Allen. Los Angeles was led by MVP Kobe Bryant and All-Star Pau Gasol.

The Celtics' 66–16 record gave them home court advantage over Los Angeles (57–25).  The Celtics won Game 1 98–88, highlighted by a dramatic comeback by Paul Pierce after a third quarter knee injury. In Game 2, the Celtics had a comfortable 24-point lead in the fourth quarter, before Kobe Bryant led a furious Lakers run that cut the lead to two. However the Celtics would hold on to win 108-102, taking the commanding 2–0 series lead.

As the series shifted to Los Angeles, the Lakers stifled Pierce and Garnett in Game 3, winning 87–81.  They also looked to be in control of Game 4, holding their ground for most of the third quarter, leading by as many as 24 points. However, the Celtics went on a 21–3 run to end the third quarter, closing the deficit to only two points (73–71). With 4:07 remaining in the fourth quarter, the Celtics took their first lead in the game when Celtics' reserve Eddie House made an 18-foot (5.5 m) jumper. With House's shot, the Celtics were in the lead for good, winning 97–91. The Celtics' victory in Game 4 was the largest comeback in the NBA Finals since 1971.

The Lakers would win Game 5 103–98, despite blowing another large lead, and the series shifted back to Boston.  However, the Celtics would close out the series in Game 6 with a dominant 131–92 win.  The 39-point margin of victory was the largest ever in an NBA championship-clinching game, breaking the old record of 33, also set by the Celtics over the Lakers in Game Five of the 1965 NBA Finals, 129–96.  Paul Pierce was named Finals MVP.

This was the Celtics' 17th championship, their first one since 1986, extending their record for most NBA championships won by a single team. Their win in Game 6 was also a sense of relief. However, for the 1994 Knicks, the first round was a best-of-five. They also set an NBA record for most playoff games ever needed to win a championship, with 26, surpassing the previous record of 24 by the Lakers in 1988.

2010 NBA Finals

This was the third straight year in which the Lakers advanced to the NBA Finals.  Much of both rosters had been kept intact since the teams last meeting in 2008 and the Celtics' veterans Paul Pierce, Kevin Garnett, Ray Allen, and Rasheed Wallace looked to add to their championship résumés, while Kobe Bryant and the Lakers looked to even the score against the Celtics. The Lakers were the defending champions, having beaten the Orlando Magic 4–1 in the 2009 NBA Finals.

The Lakers won Game 1 102–89, led by Kobe Bryant's 30-point performance.  However, Ray Allen would respond in Game 2 by scoring 32-points and sinking a record eight 3-pointers, leading the Celtics to a 103–94 victory.

Game 3 returned to Boston, where the Lakers took a 2–1 series lead by winning 91–84, again led by Bryant but with strong support from Derek Fisher.  Game 4 would prove to be a close and hard-fought game, with the Lakers up by two at the end of the third quarter.  However, Boston's bench would prove to be the deciding factor, outscoring the Lakers 13–2 for nearly half the quarter, en route to a 96–89 victory. The Celtics won the game and evened the series.

Despite an impressive 38-point performance from Bryant in Game 5, the Celtics would win 92–86 led by Paul Pierce's 27 points, and would take a 3–2 lead heading back to L.A.  However, the Lakers opened up a massive lead in Game 6, peaking at 27. The Lakers' bench had outscored Boston's bench 24–0 entering the fourth quarter.  The Lakers would win the game 89–67 and set up an epic Game 7.  Both Kendrick Perkins of Boston and Andrew Bynum of Los Angeles were injured in this game.  However, while Perkins was ruled out because of his injury, Bynum was cleared to play in Game 7.

This was the fifth Game 7 between the Lakers and Celtics. Boston had won all previous Game 7 match-ups between the two teams. Kobe Bryant exhibited difficulties for much of the game, shooting only 6-for-24 from the field.  However, he would score 10 of his game-high 24 points in the fourth quarter.  After the Celtics had built a 13-point lead late in the third quarter, the game was tied at 64 with six minutes remaining in the fourth quarter. Ron Artest would sink a key 3-pointer for the Lakers and make other clutch moves, leading Phil Jackson to call him the MVP of Game 7.  However, the Celtics would not give up, and Rajon Rondo would hit a 3-pointer to make the game 81–79.  The Celtics were forced to foul Sasha Vujačić, he went to the line and made both free throws to give the Lakers a definitive 83–79 lead.  Rondo would miss his final 3-pointer and the Lakers won Game 7 against the Celtics for the first time in franchise history, clinch their 16th NBA title, and repeat as NBA champions for the first time since their three-peat from 2000 to 2002 during the "Shaq and Kobe" era.

Game 7 was the third most-watched game in NBA history, with 28.2 million viewers (No. 1 being Game 7 of the 2016 NBA Finals, No. 2 being Game 6 of the 1998 NBA Finals). Game 7 was watched by an average audience of 1.1 million viewers on TSN, making it the largest Canadian audience ever recorded for an NBA game. This was also the first time since 2002 that a team has won back-to-back championships; that team was also the Lakers, led by Kobe and Shaquille O'Neal.

Kobe Bryant was named Finals MVP for the second straight year.

"Beat L.A.!"
One of the lasting effects on the Lakers–Celtics rivalry was the usage of the famous "Beat L.A.!" chant, sung by fans in opposing arenas whenever a Los Angeles-based team plays in their home venue. The chant originated during Game 7 of the 1982 Eastern Conference Championships at Boston Garden when the Boston fans urged the victorious Philadelphia 76ers to "Beat L.A.!"

In January 2011 before an upcoming Celtic-Lakers regular season matchup, Celtic forward Kevin Garnett with shoe company Anta released a "Beat L.A." green shoe which featured on the tongue the numbers "152–120", which was at the time the Celtics all-time record against the Lakers. The Celtics won the game, 109–96.

Head-to-head

Statistics

Common individuals

Players
The following players have played for both the Celtics and the Lakers in their careers:

Chucky Atkins – Celtics, Lakers
Jim Barnes – Lakers (–), Celtics (–)
Brandon Bass – Celtics (–), Lakers
Mike Bloom – Celtics (1948), Lakers (1948)
Vander Blue – Celtics, Lakers
Avery Bradley – Celtics (–), Lakers
Frank Brickowski – Lakers, Celtics
MarShon Brooks – Celtics, Lakers
Don Chaney – Celtics (–, –), Lakers (–)
Mel Counts – Celtics (–), Lakers (–, –)
Ernie DiGregorio – Lakers, Celtics
Hank Finkel – Lakers, Celtics (–)
Rick Fox – Celtics (–), Lakers (–)
Jumaine Jones – Celtics, Lakers
Joe Kleine – Celtics (–), Lakers
Travis Knight – Lakers (–), Celtics
Clyde Lovellette – Lakers (–), Celtics (–)
Bob McAdoo – Celtics, Lakers (–)
Chris Mihm – Celtics, Lakers (–, –)
Troy Murphy – Celtics, Lakers

Mike Muscala – Lakers, Celtics (–present)
Don Nelson – Lakers (–), Celtics (–)
Shaquille O'Neal – Lakers (–), Celtics
Gary Payton – Lakers, Celtics
Theo Ratliff – Celtics, Lakers
Fred Roberts – Celtics (–), Lakers
Rajon Rondo – Celtics (–), Lakers (–)
Matt Ryan – Celtics, Lakers
Dennis Schröder – Lakers (–present), Celtics
Charlie Scott – Celtics (–), Lakers
Brian Shaw – Celtics (–), Lakers (–)
Derek Strong – Celtics, Lakers
Gene Stump – Celtics (1947–1949), Lakers
Earl Tatum – Lakers (–), Celtics
Isaiah Thomas – Celtics (–), Lakers
Von Wafer – Lakers, Celtics
Moe Wagner – Lakers, Celtics
Kermit Washington – Lakers (–), Celtics
Shammond Williams – Celtics, Lakers

Others
The following individuals have also played, coached and/or managed both the Celtics and Lakers in their careers:
Joe Mullaney – Celtics (1949–1950 player); Lakers (1969–1971 head coach)
K. C. Jones – Celtics (1958–1967 player; 1977–1983 assistant coach; 1983–1988 head coach); Lakers (1971–1972 assistant coach)
Jim Brewer – Lakers (1980–1982 player); Celtics (2004–2006 assistant coach)
John Kuester – Celtics (1995–1997 assistant coach); Lakers (2011–2012 assistant coach)
Paul Pressey – Celtics (2004–2006 assistant coach); Lakers (2014–2016 assistant coach)
Bill Sharman – Celtics (1951–1961 player); Lakers (1971–1976 head coach; 1976–1982 general manager; 1982–1988 president)
Brian Shaw – Celtics (1988–1989; 1990–1992  player); Lakers (1999–2003 player; 2005–2011; 2016–2019 assistant coach)
Frank Vogel – Celtics (2001–2004 assistant coach); Lakers (2019–2022 head coach)
Dave Wohl – Lakers (1982–1985; 1998–1999 assistant coach); Celtics (2004–2007 assistant coach)
Lester Conner – Lakers (1995 player); Celtics (1998 assistant coach)
Tony Brown – Lakers (1990 player); Celtics (2004–2007 assistant coach)
Tyronn Lue – Lakers (1998–2001 player); Celtics (2011–2013 assistant coach)
Ime Udoka – Lakers (2004 player); Celtics (2021–present head coach)

See also

National Basketball Association rivalries
History of the Boston Celtics
History of the Los Angeles Lakers
Lakers versus Celtics and the NBA Playoffs, a videogame inspired by the rivalry
Celtics/Lakers: Best of Enemies, a 2017 documentary about the rivalry made by ESPN for its 30 for 30 series
Cavaliers-Warriors rivalry- a rivalry between the Cleveland Cavaliers and Golden State Warriors spanning from 2015 to 2018, during which both teams were the only ones to reach the NBA Finals, the most consecutive times in any major North American sport.

Notes

References

National Basketball Association rivalries
Lakers
Los Angeles Lakers